Roy Pope (15 June 1914 – 14 February 2004) was an  Australian rules footballer who played with North Melbourne in the Victorian Football League (VFL).

Notes

External links 

1914 births
2004 deaths
Australian rules footballers from Victoria (Australia)
North Melbourne Football Club players